Daniela María Cruz Mejía (born 8 March 1991) is a Costa Rican footballer who plays as a defender for Deportivo Saprissa and the Costa Rica women's national team.

Career 
Cruz made her professional debut with Sportek de Heredia where she won the second division championship and the promotion to the Costa Rica Women's Football Championship.

Later in 2010, she went to study to the United States, where she had the opportunity to play with West Florida Argonauts in NCAA Division II. She won the Division II championship with the same team in 2012.

After graduating from college in 2014, she came back to Costa Rica to play with Deportivo Saprissa FF, with Saprissa she also won the championship in 2014. Cruz won the Apertura 2015 with Saprissa and made a huge step in her career by signing with Red Star Belgrade in the Serbian First League with the option of extending her 1-year contract.

Unfortunately in 2016 her grandfather got sick so she returned to Costa Rica for three months, in her last match in Serbia she caught an injury which she had planned to treat in her home country, but the injury was so serious she had to pay for an operation with the help of her parents. Because of her injury, Red Star Belgrade didn't renew her contract, so Cruz went back to Costa Rica to play for Deportivo Saprissa FF. Last year she won the Clausura 2018 as the team captain. She was also the trainer of the U-13 female team of Saprissa.

Before leaving to Spain, Cruz also won the Apertura 2019 with Deportivo Saprissa FF, scoring an Olympic goal in the final against AD Moravia, where they tied 1-1 and then Saprissa won by penalties.

On June 5 of 2019, RCD Espanyol Femenino announced on their social media that Cruz signed with them for one season, she'll play alongside her Costa Rica teammate Katherine Alvarado.

International career 
At the young age of 13, Cruz was already called to the U-17 Costa Rica National Team squad, which eventually qualified to the 2008 FIFA U-17 Women's World Cup in New Zealand. In 2010, she had the opportunity to play in the 2010 FIFA U-20 Women's World Cup that was held in Germany, having achieved her second world cup as a very young and promising player for Costa Rica. Finally in 2014 with Cruz already playing for the senior team, Costa Rica Women's National Football Team achieved their first ever qualification to the FIFA Women's World Cup in a match against Trinidad & Tobago, which Cruz was part of. Their generation was now ready to demonstrate all their experience, and so they did. Even though Costa Rica finished 3rd in their group of the 2015 FIFA Women's World Cup, they played an amazing tournament and showed what they are capable of.

Ups and downs were to come for Cruz and her teammates in 2018, after she was part of the Costa Rica National Team that made history by winning a silver medal in the 2018 Central American and Caribbean Games which were held in Barranquilla, Colombia. But later that same year she was part of the squad that failed to reach the 2019 FIFA Women's World Cup after winning 8–0 against Cuba, but losing 1–0 and 1–3 against Jamaica and Canada.

With three World Cups in her log book, Cruz is one of Costa Rica's most valuable and important players.

Clubs 

 Sportek de Heredia
 West Florida Argonauts
 Red Star Belgrade
 Deportivo Saprissa Fútbol Femenino
RCD Espanyol Femenino

References

External links
 
 Profile  at Fedefutbol
 

1991 births
Living people
Women's association football defenders
Costa Rican women's footballers
People from Tibás
Costa Rica women's international footballers
2015 FIFA Women's World Cup players
Pan American Games bronze medalists for Costa Rica
Pan American Games medalists in football
Footballers at the 2019 Pan American Games
Footballers at the 2011 Pan American Games
Footballers at the 2015 Pan American Games
Central American and Caribbean Games silver medalists for Costa Rica
Competitors at the 2018 Central American and Caribbean Games
Central American and Caribbean Games bronze medalists for Costa Rica
Competitors at the 2014 Central American and Caribbean Games
Central American Games gold medalists for Costa Rica
Central American Games medalists in football
West Florida Argonauts women's soccer players
Deportivo Saprissa players
Primera División (women) players
RCD Espanyol Femenino players
Costa Rican expatriate footballers
Costa Rican expatriate sportspeople in the United States
Expatriate women's soccer players in the United States
Costa Rican expatriate sportspeople in Serbia
Expatriate women's footballers in Serbia
Costa Rican expatriate sportspeople in Spain
Expatriate women's footballers in Spain
Central American and Caribbean Games medalists in football
ŽFK Crvena zvezda players
Medalists at the 2019 Pan American Games